A  is a branch family established by a collateral of the honke (the line descended through the eldest male) in Japan.

See also
 Ie (Japanese family system)
 Japanese family structure
 Koseki

References 
 

Japanese family law